GNU Krell Monitors (GKrellM) is a system monitor software based on the GTK+ toolkit that creates a single process stack of system monitors. It can be used to monitor the status of CPUs, main memory, hard disks, network interfaces, local and remote mailboxes, and many other things. Plugins are available for a multitude of tasks, e.g., controlling the XMMS media player or a SETI@home client from within the stacked monitor.

Released under the terms of the GNU General Public License, GKrellM is free software.

See also

 Task manager
 System monitor
 Conky (software)

Notes and references

Further reading
 Joe Barr, "GKrellM: Geek eye-candy, monitors, and more", Linux.com, 29 October 2003
 Marcel Gagné, "Tweaking Tux, Part 5", Linux Journal, 29 October 2003

External links
 

Free system software
Software that uses GTK
System monitors